Saddington Reservoir is a canal reservoir and  biological Site of Special Scientific Interest south of Saddington in Leicestershire.
The reservoir was built between 1793 and 1797 to supply water to the Grand Union canal.

The reservoir has a range of wetland habitats, such as open water, wet willow woodland and swamp. There are a number of nationally scarce beetles, such as Carabus monilis, Atheta basicornis, Eledona agricola and Gyrophaena lucidula.

There is public access to the site.

References

Sites of Special Scientific Interest in Leicestershire
Canal reservoirs in England
Reservoirs in Leicestershire